Thomas Dale Jackson,  (born 27 October 1948) is a Canadian actor and singer. He created and starred in an annual series of Christmas concerts called the Huron Carole for 18 years. He was the Chancellor of Trent University from 2009 until 2013. He played Billy Twofeathers on Shining Time Station and Peter Kenidi on North of 60.

Life and career
Tom Jackson was born on the One Arrow Reserve, Saskatchewan, near Batoche, the son of Rose, a Cree, and Marshall, an Englishman. He moved with his family to Namao, Alberta at age seven, and then to Winnipeg, Manitoba when he was fourteen. A year later, he dropped out of high school and lived on the streets for several years.

As an actor, he has starred in television shows such as North of 60 and Shining Time Station where his character Billy Twofeathers debuted in its Halloween episode "Scare Dares", and made a guest appearance on Star Trek: The Next Generation in the season seven episode Journey's End. His films include 'Loyalties',  'The Diviners.
He also starred in Grizzly Falls, in 1999. His film career remains active with his appearance in the 2007 horror thriller,  Skinwalkers. In 2014, he appeared in acclaimed director Sidney J. Furie's The Dependables, as Sergeant Robinson. In 2019, he played White Bull, a Ute drug lord, opposite Liam Neeson in the film Cold Pursuit.

He has also released several albums of country and folk music.

Personal life
Tom now resides in Calgary with his wife Alison (née Jones) and four children.

Philanthropy
A well-known philanthropist, Jackson created an annual series of Christmas concerts called the Huron Carole. Featuring Jackson and numerous other Canadian singers and performers, the Huron Carole troupe travels across the country each year, raising money for the Canadian Association of Food Banks. An album of Christmas songs recorded to tie-in with the tour is an annual best seller in Canada. After 17 years, Jackson retired the Huron Carole and in its place launched Singing for Supper, a cross-Canada tour that plays smaller community venues raising money and gifts of food, during the 2005 Christmas season.

After North of 60'' cast member Mervin Good Eagle died by suicide in October 1996, Tom started the Dreamcatcher Tour.

In the spring of 1997 Jackson's home town was bracing for "the flood of the century" that had already put towns south of the US/Canada border under water. Jackson was instrumental in organizing flood relief concerts across the nation (Calgary, Winnipeg).

Honours and decorations
Jackson has been honoured several times for his life's work. Most notably, in 2000, he was made an Officer of the Order of Canada and is a former member of the Order of Canada Advisory Council. He has been nominated for Juno Awards and Gemini Awards. He has also received honours from several Canadian universities, including honorary degrees from the University of Calgary, Trent University and the University of Lethbridge. He also received the Humanitarian Award at the 2007 Juno Awards due to his charitable efforts.
In May 2014, Jackson received a Governor General's Performing Arts Award (GGPAA) for his lifetime contributions to Canadian broadcasting. At the Gala honouring GGPAA recipients on 10 May, Jackson took to the National Arts Centre stage to perform one of his songs.

On 14 April 2009, Jackson was announced as the tenth chancellor for Trent University. Jackson held this position until 2013.

Filmography

Discography

Albums

Singles

See also
Indigenous Canadian personalities

References

External links

Official website
Unofficial fansite
Tom Jackson profile

1948 births
Canadian country guitarists
Canadian country singers
Canadian folk guitarists
Canadian folk singers
Canadian humanitarians
Canadian male film actors
Canadian male guitarists
Canadian male television actors
Canadian Métis people
Canadian people of English descent
Canadian people of Native American descent
Chancellors of Trent University
Cree people
First Nations male actors
First Nations musicians
Governor General's Performing Arts Award winners
Indspire Awards
Living people
Métis musicians
Male actors from Calgary
Male actors from Saskatchewan
Male actors from Winnipeg
Musicians from Calgary
Musicians from Saskatchewan
Musicians from Winnipeg
Companions of the Order of Canada
20th-century Canadian guitarists
21st-century Canadian guitarists
20th-century Canadian male singers
21st-century Canadian male singers
20th-century First Nations people
21st-century First Nations people